Raymond John Smedley (born 3 September 1951) is a male retired British middle-distance runner. Smedley competed in the men's 1500 metres at the 1972 Summer Olympics. He represented England in the marathon event, at the 1982 Commonwealth Games in Brisbane, Queensland, Australia.

References

External links
 

1951 births
Living people
Athletes (track and field) at the 1972 Summer Olympics
British male middle-distance runners
Olympic athletes of Great Britain
Athletes (track and field) at the 1982 Commonwealth Games
Commonwealth Games competitors for England